Imre Simkó (6 January 1939 – 10 April 2021) was a Hungarian sport shooter who competed in the 1960 Summer Olympics and in the 1964 Summer Olympics.

References

1939 births
2021 deaths
Hungarian male sport shooters
ISSF rifle shooters
Olympic shooters of Hungary
Shooters at the 1960 Summer Olympics
Shooters at the 1964 Summer Olympics
People from Békéscsaba
Sportspeople from Békés County
20th-century Hungarian people